Datana integerrima, the walnut caterpillar moth,  is a moth of the  family Notodontidae. It is found in eastern North America, from Ontario, through most of the Eastern States west to Minnesota and south to northern Mexico.

The wingspan is 35–50 mm. Adults are on wing from May to August.

The larvae feed on hickory, pecan, Carya and Juglans species.

External links
Bug Guide
Images
Species info

Notodontidae
Moths of North America
Moths described in 1866